Henry Stanton Burton (1818–1869) was a graduate of West Point, a career American Army officer who served in the Second Seminole War, Mexican–American War and the American Civil War.

Early life 
Henry Stanton Burton was born in September 1818 at West Point, New York, where his father was employed as a sutler. He studied at the Norwich Military Academy for two years and Norwich University for one year before being appointed to the United States Military Academy at West Point from Vermont in 1835. Burton graduated on July 1, 1839 and was appointed 2nd Lieutenant, 3rd U.S. Artillery Regiment. From 1839 to 1842, he served in the Florida Indian War and on November 11, 1839 was promoted 1st Lieutenant.  From 1843 to 1846 he was assistant instructor of infantry and artillery tactics at West Point.

Mexican War and duty in California 
During the Mexican–American War he became Lieutenant Colonel of U.S. Volunteers and served as second in command of the 1st Regiment of New York Volunteers. Accepted by the U.S. Army in August 1846, the regiment was transported around Cape Horn to California where it served as garrisons. Elements of the Volunteers under Lt Colonel Burton were involved in operations of the Pacific Coast Campaign in Baja California, fighting in the Battle of La Paz, Siege of La Paz and in the final defeat of the Mexican forces at the Skirmish of Todos Santos. His command remained as a garrison in Baja California until the peace treaty returned it to Mexico.

As the war drew to a close, it appeared that Baja California would remain a Mexican state, while Alta California would become territory of the United States. Burton offered to help residents of Baja California move to Alta California and become United States citizens. Burton returned to Monterey with his command and the evacuated Mexicans. On July 9, 1849 he married one of the refugees, Maria Amparo Ruiz y Aranjo at Monterey. After his Volunteer regiment disbanded in October 1848, Burton, unlike most of them who rushed to the gold fields, returned to his regular army service; having been promoted to Captain on September 22, 1847. In 1852, he bought Rancho Jamul near San Diego and homesteaded it on March 3, 1854. In 1855, he went to San Diego, to serve as commander of the Post at Mission San Diego de Alcalá where he first established Camp Burton, as a temporary position before occupying permanent quarters in the abandoned Mission San Diego de Alcalá. While there he was living at Rancho Jamul with his family.

Civil War 
Captain Burton remained in California on duty in various forts until 1862, when, having been promoted to Major on May 14, 1861, the American Civil War began.  He was ordered to Delaware where he commanded Fort Delaware military prison until 1863.
On July 25, 1863 he was promoted Lt. Colonel, 4th U.S. Artillery Regiment. On August 11, 1863 he was promoted Colonel, 5th U.S. Artillery Regiment; and commanded the Artillery Reserve of the Army of the Potomac from 1863-1864.  He was inspector of artillery in the Richmond Campaign in the Department of the East. From 1864 he was a member of the retiring board.  On March 13, 1865, he was promoted brevet Brigadier General U. S. Army, for the capture of Petersburg, Virginia.

Later life 
Following the Civil War, Burton subsequently commanded the 5th U.S. Artillery Regiment at Fort Monroe, Virginia, at Columbia, South Carolina, at Richmond, Virginia and at Fort Adams, Rhode Island.  From October 1868 to March 1869 he was on court martial duty at New York City.  He died April 4, 1869 at Fort Adams, in Newport, Rhode Island and was buried at West Point.

External links

References

1818 births
1869 deaths
Norwich University alumni
United States Military Academy alumni
United States Army personnel of the Seminole Wars
American military personnel of the Mexican–American War
People of Vermont in the American Civil War
Union Army colonels
United States Army colonels
Burials at West Point Cemetery